A dene, derived from the Old English denu and frequently spelled dean in place names, used to be a common name for a valley, in which sense it is frequently found as a component of English place-names, such as Rottingdean and Ovingdean.

The word still survives in the Northumbrian dialect. In the English counties of Durham and Northumberland a dene is a steep-sided wooded valley through which a burn runs. Many of the incised valleys cut by small streams that flow off the Durham and Northumberland plateau into the North Sea are given the name Dene, as in Castle Eden Dene and Crimdon Dene in County Durham and Jesmond Dene in Tyne and Wear.

References

Valleys